Phi Delta Gamma may refer to:

Phi Delta Gamma (fraternity), a men's general fraternity founded at Case Western Reserve University in 1921, with a probable three chapters.
Phi Delta Gamma (professional), a professional fraternity in Forensics founded in 1924, absorbed by Tau Kappa Alpha (ΤΚΑ).
Phi Delta Gamma (recognition), a professional sorority for women graduate students, multidisciplinary, founded at American University in 
Phi Delta Gamma (social), a Puerto Rican social fraternity , founded in 1944.